"Live for Love" is a pop rock ballad by Anthony Callea from his second album A New Chapter (2006), and the first single released from the album. Anthony performed the song live at Highpoint Shopping Centre in Melbourne on 9 November, and also on Australian Idol 2006 elimination night on 6 November. When purchased at the iTunes Store, this single comes with an exclusive track entitled "Meant for Love", which didn't make the album's final cut.

Track listing
 Australian release
 "Live for Love" (single edit)
 "Live for Love" (Bc Urban Love remix)
 "Live for Love" (Bc Sub-Urban Love remix)
 "Live for Love" (music video)

Charts

References

2006 singles
Anthony Callea songs